Divzand (also Romanized as Dīvzand; also known as Dīwāzān) is a village in Badr Rural District, in the Central District of Qorveh County, Kurdistan Province, Iran. At the 2006 census, its population was 1,041, in 241 families. The village is populated by Kurds with a Azerbaijani minority.

References 

Towns and villages in Qorveh County
Kurdish settlements in Kurdistan Province

Azerbaijani settlements in Kurdistan Province